The Englar-Schweigart-Rinehart Farm is a historic home and farm complex located at Westminster, Carroll County, Maryland, United States. It consists of a brick house, a brick smokehouse, a stone springhouse, a frame bank barn, and a frame poultry house. The house is a two-story, five-by-two-bay Flemish bond brick structure painted white, and set on a rubble stone foundation. The house was constructed in 1809 or 1810. The farm is significant for its illustration of how German-Swiss immigrants to Maryland became acculturated to the dominant English culture.

The Englar-Schweigart-Rinehart Farm was listed on the National Register of Historic Places in 2003.

References

External links
, including photo in 2002, at Maryland Historical Trust

German-American culture in Maryland
Houses on the National Register of Historic Places in Maryland
Houses in Carroll County, Maryland
Federal architecture in Maryland
Houses completed in 1809
Swiss-American culture in Maryland
Westminster, Maryland
National Register of Historic Places in Carroll County, Maryland